Maging Sino Ka Man: Ang Pagbabalik (international title: More Than Love 2 / ) is a 2007 Philippine romantic family drama television series that serves as a sequel to the 2006 drama series Maging Sino Ka Man. Directed by Rory B. Quintos and Mae Czarina Cruz-Alviar, the series stars John Lloyd Cruz, Bea Alonzo, Sam Milby, Anne Curtis, Toni Gonzaga, Angelica Panganiban and Derek Ramsay with an ensemble cast consisting of Christopher de Leon, Chin Chin Gutierrez, Rosanna Roces and Phillip Salvador in their supporting roles. The series premiered on ABS-CBN's Primetime Bida nighttime block, replacing Pangarap na Bituin on its timeslot from December 10, 2007, to March 28, 2008, and it was replaced by Lovers.

The series takes place after the Finale of Maging Sino Ka Man

Cast and characters

Main cast 
John Lloyd Cruz as Gabriel "Eli" H. Roxas - Eli is a hard-working guy who comes from a poor family, who later discovers his true identity and wealth. He believes that love can surpass every challenge that may come his way, even his stature in life. An accident and a brutal discovery leads him to taking back what was originally his.  
Bea Alonzo as Jacqueline "Jackie" Madrigal-Roxas - the unica hija of a banking magnate, Jackie is the exact opposite of Eli in terms of status. After numerous events cause a whirlwind in her life, she desperately tries to reconstruct who she is without Eli in her life.
Sam Milby as Jaime "JB" R. Berenguer - A man who has everything, except his freedom. He is the heir apparent to the Roxas Shipping empire, which is now under the helm of his mother, Corazon. He always wants to help is mother, so she could be proud of him. He loves his girlfriend Jackie, but takes for granted and at times doesn't seem to really know her. He was married to Celine Magsaysay, but Celine passes away of cancer. He was in despair and burdened
Anne Curtis as Celine Magsaysay-Berenguer - Celine is a strong girl who faces every trial in her life head on. She presents a tough image for everyone to see, but in reality she carries a sadness that she cannot seem to let go. Hidden behind her image of steel is actually a heart of gold. She is engaged to JB, and they married later on. She is diagnosed with pancreatic cancer and passes away.
Toni Gonzaga as Monaliza " Onay" Dimaano / Anna Joy Romualdez - Onay is the half-sister of Eli. She faces life with a very happy and hopeful disposition despite certain circumstances. Thought to be the daughter of the deranged Oca, but actually the presumed dead daughter of Mateo. She can see the future through her cards. She became Celine's caregiver and best friend. She promised to Celine that she will take care of JB. She later fell in love with JB, but tried to hide her feelings while JB tried to accept her in his life as the one for him.
Angelica Panganiban as Ma. Elena "Lena" R. Madrigal - she is the older half-sister of Jackie. Initially, she tries to be difficult as the family brat. But after realizing the luck she has with her newfound family, she changes her ways. It is, also, her mission to be reunited once again with her long lost love, Joaquin. After a fight with her sister, she finds refuge in the church. During a medical mission, Lena falls ill. She passes away and is laid to rest beside Joaquin.
Derek Ramsay as Joaquin Delos Santos - He was Maria Lena Rubio's boyfriend. Joaquin was blind. He ran away from home to look for Lena. It was later revealed that he was struck by a vehicle then later die.

Supporting cast 
Christopher de Leon as Fidel Madrigal -Jackie's father. A wealthy banking magnate. Thinking that he is cheated by the women in his life (his mother, his wife, his daughter), he becomes so bitter towards life.  He is willing to risk everything he has to achieve the peace he has been longing to have for years.
Chin Chin Gutierrez as Corazon Roxas Berenguer Romualdez - JB's Mother. Ex matriarch of Roxas Shipping Lines. She comes from a dark past that gives her a hateful outlook in life, but in her is a pure heart screaming to be freed. She is currently married to Mateo, and is running his Uni-Pak company. In Mateo, she finds the pieces that fill the void in her once non-existent heart. 
Rosanna Roces as Veronica "Veron" Rubio - she is the once mistress of Don Fidel and the mother of Lena. She desires to get revenge on those who persecuted her in the past. She disappears from the scene to marry a wealthy business man of many wives. She returns when Lena falls ill. 
Phillip Salvador as Samuel "Mateo" Romualdez - Eli and Onay's biological father who has a lot of angst in his life. Lena also considers him as her father while Lena's mother, Veron, is Mateo's best friend. He is also the biological father of Onay, and husband of Corazon. He is currently serving time for the murder of Monique. He found out he was innocent after finding out that Fidel was the one who shot Monique.
 Bing Pimentel as Monique Madrigal - formerly Fidel's estranged wife and Jackie's estranged mother, they are now reunited again. She comforts Fidel when troubled, and acts as a pacifier whenever there is a domestic problem. She dies in a gunshot showdown between Fidel and Mateo.
 Glenda Garcia as Gloria Roxas - Corazon's younger sister, JB's aunt, and Eli's Mother. She may have some quirks in her personality but she is the one person JB runs to in times of trouble. When her only son is taken away from her, she suffered PTSD (post-traumatic stress disorder). This eventually fades, when she is reunited with her son, Eli.
Vice Ganda as Joko - Onay's cousin and partner in taking care of their Grandfather.
Lou Veloso as Lolo Bogs - the Grandfather and only relative of Onay and Insan.
Bembol Roco as Tomas Arroyo - Corazon's "companion". He wants everything to take place according to plan. He treats Corazon as a possession, not as a wife and would torture or beat her if she gets away from him or he thinks she's cheating on him.  He is also Fidel's Fraternity Brother and responsible for some of Mateo's grievances. He was killed by Mateo's goons after attempting to kill Corazon and JB.
Tommy Abuel as Daniel Jimenez - Mateo's longtime business partner and friend. His loyalty is questioned as he is/was associated with all three of the power hungry men (Fidel, Mateo, and Tomas).
 Smokey Manaloto as Apolinario "Pong" Davide - Eli's older brother. Who was then brought to a medical institution due to his physical injuries and mental trauma. After a very long time, Pong is released and is trying to assimilate himself into the world outside.
 Juliana Palermo as Vanessa Domingo - JB's seductive and socialite boss who tries to pick him up.
Malou de Guzman as Bebeng - Friend of Jackie and Eli, who's now coping up with the loss of her husband, Mang Simo.
Anita Linda as Impo - A famous psychic and paranormal healer, whom Lena always goes to.
Angel Aquino as Andrea - Onay's mother
 Val Iglesias as Jacinto - Syndicate Influence to fight against Mateo.
Jon Avila as Mark - Jackie's secret admirer and new boss.

Plot
The story of the sequel begins six months after Eli and Jackie's wedding

Part 1: Six Months Later
Six months after Eli and Jackie are married, things seemed to be doing well and fine—the two are enjoying their second honeymoon in Barcelona, Jackie's parents are reunited, and JB and Celine are engaged. Jackie has also told Eli that she might be pregnant. But conflict soon arises when Jackie bleeds and discovers that she is not pregnant after all. The Madrigals’ newly inaugurated business was also attacked by a mysterious bomber. Celine also suffers from stomach pains and JB instantly figured out that she might be pregnant.

Meanwhile, a new character appears on scene—a certain Jessica who steps up and confronts Fidel about their previous affair. Veronica reveals that Lena is also Fidel's daughter and she is bound to seek revenge for what she and her daughter had been through all these years. In the midst of Jackie's charity work for the victims of the explosion, Veronica disguises herself as a meek and weak mother of a sick daughter who's a big fan of Jackie's. Goodhearted Jackie promised her that she would visit her daughter one of these days and it will be the beginning of another chain of trials in her life.

Part 2: The Revenge of the Mistress and the Daughter
Lena and Veron starts to suck up to Fidel's family and begins to ruin their lives.

Everyone rushes as a new day begins. Jackie prepares to visit Veron and her daughter while Veron makes frantic calls to Lena to come home. Celine struggles to hide her condition from JB while Eli is sent by Fidel to meet with a certain Mr. Jimenez. In his meeting, Eli tries to convince Mr. Jimenez to invest on Fidel's project but refuses to do so because of his father-in-law's reputation. Because of what he heard, Eli was forced to defend Fidel's credibility but only ended up upsetting both Mr. Jimenez and Fidel. So he goes to Sta. Rita to seek comfort in confiding to Dadoods in his grave.

Meanwhile, Jackie and Celine too were upset to find that Veron had tricked them to come to her house only so she could reveal to them that Lena is Jackie's half sister. The two cousins were not convinced by this and left but Jackie remains bothered by the incident. Soon, Jackie discovers that Celine might be pregnant but is saddened by the fact that she might end up not having a child at all. Lena confronts her mother and asks her to stop begging the Madrigal's to accept her as family, but Veron insists on seeking revenge so Lena decided to run away. She returns to Sta. Rita to reunite with Joaquin, her one true love. She fails to find him there but instead meets Eli whom she mistook as Joaquin.

Veron tried to seduce Fidel while Monique and Jackie aren't in the house but Veron was stopped.

Amang/Mateo told Eli about his past with Fidel. It is revealed that he was badly beaten when he was still young, and left in a very bad state. A woman found her and they had a relationship; they too had a daughter (Onay/Annajoy). It is also revealed why Mateo's hand was disfigured - Fidel ordered Tomas to shoot Mateo's hand using a gun. When Mateo went abroad for a better living, he learned that his wife was raped by Fidel. He went back to Philippines for revenge though being stopped by his wife; a fire later broke out in the area and he was thinking that his wife and daughter perished, though his presumed dead daughter Onay is actually alive. When Fidel asked Eli about his business plans for Mateo, Eli told his father-in-law that he will let Mateo join their company. Fidel felt uneasy because Veron (also Mateo's assistant) told him that she will be in his office as long as Mateo is in his house.

Corazon shared moments with Mateo. When she was going back home, Tomas caught her and dragged her into his car. When they reached their house, Tomas beat her and pointed a gun on her. Corazon tried to resist, and Mateo went into Tomas' house. In the process JB also goes to the same house, and Tomas and Mateo fought for the gun, with Mateo trying to prevent Tomas. JB gets accidentally shot and was rushed to the hospital. Celine vomited, too and was rushed by Onay to the hospital. Tomas was assaulted by Amang's men.

Part 3: Quarrel Tension
The fight between Veron and Lena and the Madrigals unravels.

Lena's hopes fell when 'Joaquin' turned out to be someone else. Jackie is so sorry about the whole thing that she vows to do everything in her power to find Lena's true love. Lena tearfully assures her though that she appreciates her efforts to join her endless search, which has strengthened their bond as sisters.

After working overnight, JB is doubly pressured by Celine's stubbornness as well as his boss's demands. Vanessa forces him to party with their team for having his condotel proposal approved by the board. As if that's not enough, Corazon keeps on complaining about being left at home alone.

Celine avoids JB's calls the whole day. But instead of letting her drown in misery, Onay helps her find a nice dress to wear for her offer of truce with JB. Then they drop by at JBs office that night, not knowing that he's off to some sort of celebration.

Eli makes peace with Corazon when Mateo asks him to deliver a gift for her. However, no amount of begging on Eli's part can persuade Corazon to let go of the past and that restoring her shipping business might be the only thing to change her mind.

Part 4: Life Begins, Life Ends
Jackie and Eli starts their new lives while Monique's death causes sympathy to everyone.

Mateo is enjoying his lunch date with Corazon when he suddenly spots Fidel and Monique in the restaurant. He invites the two to join them even though the tinge of dislike between him and Fidel is obvious. Tension rises however as soon as Mateo mentions that he would have married a girl once but was ruined because of an enemy. As such, Fidel hurriedly switches to another table before Monique could grasp what was being hinted at.

Lena, Jackie and Eli join forces in searching for Joaquin. Nana Impo tells them that perhaps, Eli's dream wants them to return to the place where Lena and Joaquin first found their love. Lena insists that Joaquin is alive and that they will be reunited in time. Also, Eli learns that his near-death experience has made him open to odd visions. And Nana Impo reminds him that love will always guide him through various struggles.

Looking at Monique's lifeless body in the morgue, Jackie can't believe that her mom is really gone. Upon seeing Fidel, Jackie expresses her fury at him for his ruthlessness that led to this heartbreaking event, all for the sake of money, power and pride. For Jackie, it makes no difference whether Mateo or Fidel is to blame. In truth though, both father and daughter are haunted by their memories of Monique.

Eli feels helpless towards Jackie's grief and ends up accusing Mateo of killing Monique. Mateo however is trying to remember exactly what happened and he believes that he's not guilty of the crime. But since Eli is already bent on judging him, Mateo chooses not to defend himself to his son or to Corazon. All he knows is that he will fight Fidel until the end.

Everyone else is equally devastated with the tragedy. JB somehow blames himself for telling Eli about his long-lost sibling which pushed Mateo into facing Fidel in a duel. Unknown to them, Lolo Bogs is convincing Onay to meet her father before it's too late. Onay however is still having second thoughts for she can't forgive the person who abandoned her and her mother.

At the funeral, Jackie refuses to leave Monique's resting place just yet so Eli leaves her alone for a while. Eli then bumps into his father-in-law who swears that he and Mateo will pay for his wife's death.

Part 5: Jealousy and Anger
Celine envies JB's assistant

In Tagaytay, Vanessa takes drastic steps in seducing JB for real. She enters his bedroom in the middle of the night but JB brushes off her overtures. JB makes it clear that he's really committed to Celine so Vanessa ends up being friends with him instead.

Back in the spa, Corazon puts a guilt trip on Celine for letting JB shoulder the burden in their family. This adds up to Celine's despair especially after hearing the doctor's diagnosis that her cancer is advancing and that the chemo therapy has failed to make her better.

As such, Celine chooses to suffer alone. First, she secretly checks JB out in his work site then decides to flee home for a while. Onay however refuses to let her set off alone. Then when JB finally arrives, he is shocked to see that most of Celine's clothes are gone.

Part 6: Celine's Death
Celine's death connects the characters as they reunite for her last moments.

Except for Mateo, everyone else participates in scattering Celine's ashes in the beach which held beautiful memories for her. Even Corazon genuinely grieves for Celine's death and regrets distancing herself to his son's wife before. JB on the other hand pretends to be strong enough to move on as he busies himself with loads of work in Mateo's company which is being managed by his mom for the time being.

Well-aware of his sorrow, Corazon asks JB not to push himself too hard. But the latter merely brushes off her concern and accuses her of feeling relieved now that Celine is gone. Onay, who happens to witness the whole exchange, tells JB that Celine would be disappointed with his attitude. But JB doesn't care about anything anymore except putting an end to his misery.

After several months, the court finally charges Mateo guilty of murder. Onay suggests a motion for appeal but her father insists to pay for all his sins inside the prison. Mateo also asks for Eli's forgiveness and even advises him to fix his problem with Jackie. But it seems it's also too late for Eli as Jackie decides to annul their marriage.

Part 7: Who's to Blame
Celine's death affects every lives of the characters.

Onay punches Eli on the face just to stop him from raising hell. But his bitter encounter with Jackie and her boss leaves him drunk the whole night which forces Onay to take a leave so she can look after her brother. In the meantime, her absence from the office enrages JB who wants her to attend to her responsibilities immediately. But since she hasn't shown up, JB vents his anger to Corazon. His mother on the other hand merely laughs at his strange reaction towards Onay.

As soon as Eli gets sober, he visits Monique's grave to help him think things through. It finally dawns upon him that it's too late to fix his marriage so he meets up with Jackie to tell her that he will cooperate with their process of annulment. Back in Mateo's company, Onay presents her new marketing ideas to the board but JB embarrasses her again by discrediting her report. Later, she learns that JB hates the mere sight of her because she reminds him of Celine so much

Part 8: Trials
The trial begins for Jackie and Eli's divorce. While JB's loyalty to Celine's love is tested as Onay expressed her true feelings.

When JB falls into an accident, Onay persistently looks after him for the sake of her promise to Celine. JB resents her concern at first but as soon as he recovered from his injuries, he makes peace with his grief then later on with Onay. This time starting afresh includes being "extra nice" to Onay, whose secret feelings for JB is returning as Corazon gives her blessing for her to heal JB's broken heart!

Meanwhile, Jackie and Eli's annulment case is now on court. Jackie strengthens her petition as she narrates Eli and Lena's betrayal which led to her miscarriage. Outside the trial though, Eli begins to pick up the pieces in his life by performing well in Mateo's company. Jackie on the other hand is still oblivious to Lena's regular visits at Monique's grave. What leaves her in shock though is seeing Eli with a date in a restaurant where she is meeting with a client! Does she still have some feelings left for her soon-to-be ex-husband?

Finale of Book 2: A Tremendous Cliffhanger

After more than two years inside the prison, Mateo is still troubled by his recurring dreams about Monique. It finally dawns on him that Daniel witnessed the whole incident and it was really Fidel who fired the shot that killed his wife. He shares this latest development with Eli and Onay as well as his decision to reopen his murder case.

This is the very thing that Fidel fears the most for he is also haunted by his vivid memories of Monique's death especially after seeing Eli again. Still in denial of his own sins, he forces Jackie to promise him never to settle things with Eli again, as if this would make his fears and the truth go away.

Jackie however receives a message from a mysterious caller, telling her that he knows what really happened to her mother. So, she agrees to secretly meet with him, not knowing that Fidel has overheard the whole exchange. Is this person the key not only to Mateo's freedom but also Jackie and Eli's much-awaited reconciliation?

The truth about Monique's death would have been revealed earlier on if Daniel hadn't chickened out during Mateo's trial in the court two years earlier. But as he finally stands up for what is just, Mateo escapes the prison to face Fidel again, in the same place where they fought before.

This time however, Jackie, JB, Onay and Eli arrive in time to stop them from killing each other. When Fidel refuses to calm down though, Mateo reveals that it was the former who killed Monique back then. Faced with his own guilt, Fidel loses his sanity and lands in a mental hospital despite Jackie's forgiveness.

After six months, Mateo is released from the prison, Corazon encourages JB to love again and Jackie finally realizes that she still loves Eli. This time, Jackie runs after him just when he's about to give up on her. Luckily, Eli hears her plea and both of them are reconciled at last. In the end, Jackie gets pregnant and lives happily married with Eli.

On the other hand, JB seeks Onay's forgiveness back on the island. Not one to carry a grudge for too long, Onay agrees to be friends with him as long as they keep in mind their special memories of Celine.

Episode guide

Marketing
The series was part of ABS-CBN's promotion of its prime time line up for the first quarter of 2008, dubbed as "One Gr8 January 28" where three prime time shows all premiered at the same night, namely Kung Fu Kids, Lobo, and Palos. Maging Sino Ka Man premiered a month earlier prior to the scheduled premiere.

References

ABS-CBN drama series
2007 Philippine television series debuts
2008 Philippine television series endings
Television series by Star Creatives
Philippine melodrama television series
Philippine romance television series
Filipino-language television shows
Television shows set in the Philippines